Sidney Gish (born March 18, 1997) is an American singer-songwriter. She has released three albums, Ed Buys Houses, No Dogs Allowed, and Filming School.

Career
Gish's first album, Ed Buys Houses, was self-released on Bandcamp in 2016. 

Her second album, No Dogs Allowed, was released in 2017, receiving a 7.7 rating on Pitchfork and winning Album of the Year at the 2018 Boston Music Awards. 

Following the moderate internet success of No Dogs Allowed, Gish briefly toured with singer-songwriter Mitski in 2018. In March 2019, she performed at South by Southwest and was featured on NPR Music's Austin 100. She was listed as one of Stereogum's Best New Artists of 2018.

In 2023, she toured with The Beths in North America.

Personal life
In 2020, Gish graduated from Northeastern University, where she studied Music Industry.

Discography

Studio albums

Bandcamp exclusives 
 don't call on me (2015)
 Merry Crisis EP (2016)
 dummy parade (2016)
 Little Room (The White Stripes Cover) from a compilation album (2020)

Music videos 
 "It's Afternoon, I'm Feeling Sick" (2016)
 "Cokesbury" (2016)
 "Buckets of Fun" (2017)
 "Midnight Jingle" (2017; dir. Ethan Judelson)
 "I'm Filled With Steak, and Cannot Dance" (2018)
 "Sin Triangle" (2019, dir. Al Bako)

Awards and nominations

References

External links 
 Official page on Bandcamp

Living people
American women singer-songwriters
Place of birth missing (living people)
21st-century American singers
21st-century American women singers
1997 births